Cavernous hemangioma, also called cavernous angioma, venous malformation, or cavernoma, is a type of venous malformation due to endothelial dysmorphogenesis from a lesion which is present at birth. A cavernoma in the brain is called a cerebral cavernous malformation or CCM.  Despite its designation of a hemangioma, a cavernous hemangioma is not a tumor as it does not display endothelial hyperplasia. The abnormal tissue causes a slowing of blood flow through the cavities, or "caverns". The blood vessels do not form the necessary junctions with surrounding cells, and the structural support from the smooth muscle is hindered, causing leakage into the surrounding tissue. It is the leakage of blood, referred to as hemorrhage, that causes a variety of symptoms known to be associated with the condition.

Symptoms
People with this condition in the brain may or may not experience symptoms. Some complications of the condition are life-threatening or cause major disruptions to normal functioning. Dangerous seizures due to compression of the brain, bleeding inside the brain tissue, vision problems, difficulty with speaking or using words, memory loss, ataxia, or hydrocephalus can occur. Less serious symptoms may include headaches and weakness or numbness in the arms or legs, though these symptoms alone do not indicate a person has the condition. In the eye, it may cause disruption or damage to the extraocular muscles and optic nerve which may manifest as double vision, progressive proptosis, decreased visual acuity, or other vision changes. It can lead to partial or complete blindness. When the condition occurs in the liver it usually does not cause symptoms, but some may experience pain in the upper right abdomen, a feeling of fullness after eating only a small amount of food, decreased appetite, nausea, or vomiting.

Presentation
Cavernous hemangiomas can arise nearly anywhere in the body where there are blood vessels.  They are sometimes described as resembling raspberries because of the appearance of bubble-like caverns. Unlike capillary hemangiomas, cavernous ones can be life-threatening and do not regress.

Causes
Most cases of cavernomas are thought to be congenital; however they can develop over the course of a lifetime. While there is no definitive cause, research suggests that genetic mutations result in the condition. Congenital hemangiomas that appear on the skin are known as either vascular or red birthmarks.

Familial cerebral cavernous malformations are known to occur. The mutations may be inherited in an autosomal dominant fashion or occur sporadically. Overall, familial disease is thought to be responsible for one-third to one-half of cases. In the US, approximately 50% of Hispanic patients with cerebral  cavernous malformations have a familial form. In contrast, the familiar form of the condition accounts for only 10 to 20% of cases in Caucasians. The reason for this difference is not presently known.

Several genes – K-Rev interaction trapped 1 (ССМ1), Malcavernin (CCM2) and Programmed cell death protein 10 (ССМ3) – have been identified as having mutations thought to be related to these lesions. These genes are located at 7q21.2 (chromosome 7 long arm), 7p13 (chromosome 7 short arm) and 3q25.2-q27 (chromosome 3 long arm) respectively. These lesions are further discussed in the Online Mendelian Inheritance in Man site – the reference numbers are OMIM 116860, OMIM 603284 and OMIM 603285 respectively.

Variations

Cerebral cavernomas
Cavernous hemangiomas located in the brain or spinal cord are referred to as cerebral cavernomas or more usually as cerebral cavernous malformations (CCMs), and can be found in the white matter, but often abut the cerebral cortex. When they contact the cortex, they can represent a potential seizure focus for the patient. Unlike other cavernous hemangiomas, there is no tissue within the malformation and its borders are not encapsulated. Therefore, they can change in size and number over time.

Liver cavernous hemangioma
Cavernous hemangiomas are erroneously called the most common benign tumors of the liver. Usually one malformation exists, but multiple lesions can occur in the left or right lobe of the liver in 40% of patients. Their sizes can range from a few millimeters to 20 centimetres. Those over 5 cm are often referred to as giant hemangiomas. These lesions are better classified as venous malformations.

Eye cavernous hemangioma
In the eye, it is known as orbital cavernous hemangioma and is found in women more frequently than men, most commonly between the ages of 20–40. This neoplasm is usually located within the muscle cone, which is lateral to the optic nerve. It is not usually treated unless the patient is symptomatic. Visual impairment happens when the optic nerve is compressed or the extraocular muscles are surrounded.

Mechanism
There are several known causes for cavernous hemangiomas, but some cases are still unknown. Radiation treatment used for other medical conditions has been suggested to cause cavernous malformation in some patients.
Hemangioma tumors are a result of rapid proliferation of endothelial cells and pericytic hyperplasia, or the enlargement of tissue as a result of abnormal cell division pericytes. The pathogenesis of hemangioma is still not understood. It has been suggested that growth factors and hormonal influences contribute to the abnormal cell proliferation. Cavernous liver hemangiomas are more commonly diagnosed in women who have been pregnant. As a result of this, it is believed that estrogen levels may play a role in the incidence of liver cavernomas. 
Genetic studies show that specific gene mutations or deletions are causes for the disease. The genes identified for cerebral cavernous hemangiomas (or malformations), are CCM1 (also KRIT1), CCM2 (also MGC4607, malcavernin) and CCM3 (also PDCD10). The loss of function of these genes is believed to be responsible for cerebral cavernous malformations. Furthermore, it is also believed that a "second hit mutation" is necessary for the onset of the disease. This means that having a mutation in one of the two genes present on a chromosome is not enough to cause the cavernous malformation, but mutation of both alleles would cause the malformation. Additionally, research on hemangiomas in general has shown that loss of heterozygosity is common in tissue where hemangioma develops. This would confirm that more than a single allele mutation is needed for the abnormal cell proliferation. KRIT1 has been shown to act as a transcription factor in the development of arterial blood vessels in mice. CCM2 has overlapping structure with CCM1 (KRIT1) and acts as a scaffolding protein when expressed. Both genes are involved with MAP3K3 and thus appear to be a part of the same pathway.  CCM2 has been shown to cause embryonic death in mice. Lastly, the CCM3 gene has been shown to have similar expression to CCM1 and CCM2, suggesting a link in its functionality. Currently, no experiments have determined its exact function. The lack of function of these genes in control of a proliferative signaling pathway would result in uncontrolled proliferation and the development of a tumor. In 2018, it was theorized that proliferation of endothelial cells with dysfunctional tight junctions, that are under increased endothelial stress from elevated venous pressure provides the pathophysiological basis for cavernous hemangioma development.

Diagnosis

Gradient-Echo T2WI magnetic resonance imaging (MRI) is most sensitive method for diagnosing cavernous hemangiomas. MRI is such a powerful tool for diagnosis, it has led to an increase in diagnosis of cavernous hemangiomas since the technology's advent in the 1980s. The radiographic appearance is most commonly described as "popcorn" or "mulberry"-shaped.  Computed tomography (CT) scanning is not a sensitive or specific method for diagnosing cavernous hemangiomas. Angiography is typically not necessary, unless it is required to rule out other diagnoses. Additionally, biopsies can be obtained from tumor tissue for examination under a microscope. It is essential to diagnose cavernous hemangioma because treatments for these lesions are less aggressive than that of cancerous tumors, such as angiosarcoma. However, since MRI appearance is practically pathognomonic, biopsy is rarely needed for verification.

On ultrasound, cavernous haemangiomas in liver appeared as homogenous, hyperechoic lesions with posterior acoustic enhancement. On CT or MRI scans, it shows peripheral globular/nodular enhancement in the arterial phase, with portions of attenuation of enhancing areas. In the portal venous phase, it shows progressive centripetal enhancement. In delayed phase, it shows retention of contrast. It shows a high signal on T2 weighted images.

Treatment
Asymptomatic lesions may not require treatment but may need to be monitored for any change in the size. A change in size of lesions in the nose, lips, or eyelids can be treated with steroid drugs to slow its progress. Steroids can be taken orally or injected directly into the tumor. Applying pressure to the tumor can also be used to minimize swelling at the site of the hemangioma. A procedure that uses small particles to close off the blood supply is known as sclerotherapy. This allows for tumor shrinkage and less pain. It is possible for the tumor to regrow its blood supply after the procedure has been done. If the lesion caused by the cavernous hemangioma is destroying healthy tissue around it or if the patient is experiencing major symptoms, then surgery can be used to remove the cavernoma piecemeal.  A common complication of the surgery is hemorrhage and the loss of blood. There is also the possibility of the hemangioma reoccurring after its removal. Additionally, the risk of a stroke or death is also possible.

Treatments for cerebral cavernous hemangiomas include radiosurgery or microsurgery. The treatment approach depends on the site, size and symptoms present, as well as the history of hemorrhage from the lesion. Microsurgery is generally preferred if the cerebral cavernous hemangioma is superficial in the central nervous system, or the risk of damage to surrounding tissue from irradiation is too high. Additionally, a large hemorrhage with deterioration of the patient or intractable symptoms (such as seizures or coma) are further indications for microsurgical intervention. Gamma-knife radiation is the favored mechanism of radiosurgery. It provides a precise radiation dose to the cerebral cavernous hemangioma while relatively sparing the surrounding tissue. These treatment approaches for cavernous hemangiomas in other regions of the body have limited research.

Prognosis
A few studies have worked on providing details related to the outlook of disease progression. Two studies show that each year 0.5% of people who have never had bleeding from their brain cavernoma, but had symptoms of seizures, were affected by bleeding. In contrast, patients who have had bleeding from their brain cavernoma in the past had a higher risk of being affected by subsequent bleeding. The statistics for this are very broad, ranging from 4–23% a year. Additional studies suggest that women and patients under the age of 40 are at higher risk of bleeding, but similar conducted studies did not reach the same conclusion. However, when cavernous hemangiomas are completely excised, there is very little risk of growth or rebleeding. In terms of life expectancy, not enough data has been collected on patients with this malformation in order to provide a representative statistical analysis.

Epidemiology
The true incidence of cavernous hemangiomas is difficult to estimate because they are frequently misdiagnosed as other venous malformations. Cavernous hemangiomas of the brain and spinal cord (cerebral cavernous hemangiomas (malformations) (CCM)), can appear at all ages but usually occur in the third to fourth decade of a person's life with no sexual preference. In fact, CCM is present in 0.5% of the population. However, approximately 40% of those with malformations have symptoms. Asymptomatic individuals are usually individuals that developed the malformation sporadically, while symptomatic individuals usually have inherited the genetic mutation. The majority of diagnoses of CCM are in adults; however, 25% of cases of CCM are children. Approximately 5% of adults have liver hemangiomas in the United States, but most are asymptomatic. Liver hemangiomas usually occur between the ages of 30–50 and more commonly in women. Cases of infantile liver cavernomas are extremely rare. Cavernous hemangioma of the eye is more prevalent in women than men and between the ages of 20–40.

Research
In the treatment of a brain cavernous hemangioma, neurosurgery is usually the treatment chosen. Research needs to be conducted on the efficacy of treatment with stereotactic radiation therapy, especially on the long-term. However, radiotherapy is still being studied as a form of treatment if neurosurgery is too dangerous due to the location of the cavernoma. Genetic researchers are still working on determining the cause of the illness and the mechanism behind blood vessel formation. Clinical trials are being conducted to better assess when it is appropriate to treat a patient with this malformation and with what treatment method. Additionally, long-term studies are being conducted because there is no information related to the long-term outlook of patients with cavernoma. An existing registry known as The International Cavernous Angioma Patient Registry collects information from patients diagnosed with cavernoma in order to facilitate discovery of non-invasive treatments.

References

Further reading

External links 
Alliance to Cure Cavernous Malformation "It is our mission to inform, support, and mobilize those affected by cavernous angioma and drive research for better treatments and a cure. We do this by developing and executing strategic, creative, high-return interventions as a model for rare diseases."
Cavernoma Alliance UK, "Mission: To work to find a cure for cavernoma, improving treatment and supporting those affected by cavernoma along the way."

Benign neoplasms
Dermal and subcutaneous growths